Burning Bridges or Burnin' Bridges may refer to:

Albums 
 Burning Bridges (Haste the Day album), 2004
 Burning Bridges (Arch Enemy album), 1999, or the title song
 Burning Bridges (Bon Jovi album), 2015, or the title song
 Burning Bridges (Glen Campbell album), 1967
 Burning Bridges, a 1964 album by Jack Scott, or the title song (below)
 Burning Bridges (Naked Eyes album), 1983, or the title song

EPs
 Burning Bridges (EP) a 2014 EP by Ludacris
 Burning Bridges, a 1999 EP by Ann Beretta

Songs 
 "Burning Bridges" (Jack Scott song), 1960
 "Burning Bridges" (Mike Curb song), 1971, the theme to the film Kelly's Heroes
 "Burning Bridges" (Pink Floyd song), 1972
 "Burning Bridges" (Status Quo song), 1988
 "Burning Bridges", a song by Against Me!
 "Burning Bridges", a song by Bea Miller from Chapter One: Blue and Aurora
 "Burning Bridges", a song by Collective Soul from Hints Allegations and Things Left Unsaid
 "Burning Bridges", a song by Crematory from Pray
 "Burning Bridges", a song by Crimson Glory from Transcendence
 "Burning Bridges", a song by Emerson, Lake and Palmer from Black Moon
 "Burning Bridges", a song by Family from Fearless
 "Burning Bridges", a song by Garth Brooks from Ropin' the Wind
 "Burning Bridges", a song by George Jones from Jones Country
 "Burning Bridges", a song by Ghost Machine from Hypersensitive
 "Burning Bridges", a song by Japan from Gentlemen Take Polaroids
 "Burning Bridges", a song by Jason Mraz from Mr. A–Z
 "Burnin' Bridges", a song by Jessie James from Jessie James
 "Burning Bridges", a song by Kittie from Until the End
 "Burning Bridges", a song by k-os from Yes!
 "Burning Bridges", a song by Megadeth from The World Needs a Hero
 "Burning Bridges", a song by Mest from Mest
 "Burning Bridges", a song by OneRepublic from Native
 "Burning Bridges", a song by Remy Shand from "The Way I Feel (Remy Shand album)", 2002
 "Burning Bridges", a song by Seventh Day Slumber from Finally Awake
 "Burning Bridges", a song by Sigrid
 "Burnin' Bridges", a song by Slaughter from Stick It to Ya
 "Burning Bridges", a song by Survivor from Too Hot to Sleep

Other media 
 Burning Bridges (film), a 1928 film starring Harry Carey
 Burning Bridges, a 1989 novel by Maurice Leitch
 Burning Bridges, a TV movie starring Meredith Baxter
 The Burning Bridge, a 2005 Ranger's Apprentice novel by John Flanagan

See also
 The Burning Bridges Tour, a 2005 comedy album by Maria Bamford
 "Bridge Burning", a song by Foo Fighters
 Bridges Worth Burning, an album by the band Kind of Like Spitting
 Bridges Will Burn, a 2010 EP by Rise to Remain